Amund was a rural unincorporated community in Eden Township, Winnebago County, Iowa, United States.  It is located along county highways A16 and R34.

History

A post office operated in Amund from 1888 to 1907.  The community may have been named for Amund Fosness, who brought mail.  It had a skimming station, store, and blacksmith shop, among other similar concerns.  A school was located a mile north of the store.

Amund's milk station used large volume separators to skim off cream, and was consolidated into the Thompson Cooperative Creamery in 1897.

Amund's population, in 1902, was 22.

The community was meant to serve the farming community, and the lack of a railroad led to its dissolution.  The local Forest City Summit newspaper reported in 1955 that the former location was still known as Amund corner.  It noted that early settlers remembered Fourth of July celebrations at Amund with baseball games and bowery dances.(28 July 1955). Ancestors Retain Eden Farms, Forest City Summit

References

Unincorporated communities in Winnebago County, Iowa
Unincorporated communities in Iowa